Mangelia serrula is a species of sea snail, a marine gastropod mollusk in the family Mangeliidae.

Description
The length of the shell attains 6.75 mm, its diameter 3 mm.

Distribution
This marine species was found off KwaZulu-Natal, South Africa

References

External links
 Barnard, K. H. "The work of the SS Pieter Faure in Natal waters, with special reference to the Crustacea and Mollusca; with descriptions of new species of Mollusca from Natal." Annals of the Natal Museum 16.1 (1964): 9–29.
 
  Tucker, J.K. 2004 Catalog of recent and fossil turrids (Mollusca: Gastropoda). Zootaxa 682:1–1295.

Endemic fauna of South Africa
serrula
Gastropods described in 1964